Brenton Lamont Strange (born December 27, 2000) is an American football tight end for the Penn State Nittany Lions.

Early life and high school career
Strange grew up in Parkersburg, West Virginia and attended Parkersburg High School. He has 57 receptions for 938 yards and 12 touchdowns as a junior. Strange was rated a four-star recruit and committed to play college football at Penn State over offers from Ohio State, Notre Dame, and Purdue.

College career
Strange played in two games as a true freshman and caught one pass for a four-yard touchdown reception before redshirting the season. He played in nine games with five start and had 17 receptions for 164 yards and two touchdowns in his redshirt freshman season. Strange caught 20 passes for 225 yards and three touchdowns as a redshirt sophomore. He began his redshirt junior season as the Nittany Lions' primary tight end.

References

External links
Penn State Nittany Lions bio

Living people
American football tight ends
Penn State Nittany Lions football players
Players of American football from West Virginia
Year of birth missing (living people)